System crash may refer to the following:

 Crash (computing), a computer system that has encountered an error
 System Crash (TV series), a television series
 System Crash, a music band

See also
 System (disambiguation)
 Crash (disambiguation)